Lukkarinen is a Finnish surname. Notable people with the surname include:

 Impi Lukkarinen (1918–2010), Finnish journalist and politician
 Marjut Rolig (born 1966), née Lukkarinen, Finnish cross-country skier
 Mari Lukkarinen, Finnish orienteering competitor

Finnish-language surnames